Apedinella is a genus of heterokonts.

It includes a single species, Apedinella radians.

References

Heterokont genera
Monotypic algae genera
Dictyochophyceae